Hope railway station may refer to:

Hope station (Arkansas), in Hope, Arkansas, United States
Hope station (British Columbia) in Hope, British Columbia, Canada
Hope railway station (Wales) in Hope, Flintshire
Hope railway station (England), in Hope, Derbyshire

See also
Hope (disambiguation)
Hope Exchange railway station, Flintshire, Wales